Girishh Gopalakrishnan (born 26 September 1986) is an Indian music composer, music producer, singer in the Tamil film industry. He made his debut as a music director with the Tamil film, Marina directed by Pandiraj.

Early life and career

Girishh was born on 26 September 1986 in Tanjore, Tamil Nadu. He is a student of violinist Lalgudi Jayaraman and started learning music under him from the age of 8. He also trained in western classical music under the late Das Daniel.

Girishh graduated as an engineer in 2008 and went on to do his master's degree in music composition at Leeds College of Music. He then continued to stay on in the UK working as a freelance Composer and Conductor for Orchestras, composing music for film, dance and theatre productions.

In October 2011, Girishh got a chance to meet Pandiraj through Sivakarthikeyan, who eventually signed him on to compose music for Marina, as he required an international sound to the film's score. The music for Marina released on 9 January 2012, to extremely positive reviews, critical acclaim and popularity, with the song "Vanakkam Chennai" and its promo video going viral. The film's soundtrack and background score received critical acclaim.

After Marina, Girishh worked on director Balaji K. Kumar's "Vidiyum Munn", an experimental thriller. The film features the song "Penne" sung by British Singer Susheela Raman. The audio for Vidiyum Mun was launched on 16 August 2013, under Sony's Saregama label. Vidiyum Munn's soundtrack marks a unique occurrence where the composer has written all the lyrics for the songs, along with composing them.

"Vidiyum Munn" released on 29 November 2013, to rave reviews for the film, the film's music and the background score, which was recorded in Manchester, UK with players from the BBC Philharmonic Orchestra. The score was conducted by Brian Morrell, who has worked with the likes of Elton John and Sting.

Filmography

Film soundtracks

Upcoming films
Pakshi
Kolai
Address

Albums 

 The films are listed in order that the music released, regardless of the dates the film released.
 The year next to the title of the affected films indicates the release year of the either dubbed or remade version in the named language later than the original version.
 • indicates original language release. Indicates simultaneous makes, if featuring in more languages
 ♦ indicates a remade version, the remaining ones being dubbed versions

References

External links
 

Living people
Musicians from Chennai
Tamil film score composers
Tamil musicians
1986 births
Alumni of Leeds College of Music
Indian male film score composers
Telugu film score composers